Zephyr Cove is a community and census-designated place (CDP) in Douglas County, Nevada, United States. The population was 565 at the 2010 census. Prior to 2010 it was part of the Zephyr Cove–Round Hill Village CDP.

History
Before Zephyr Cove was established, the Native American Washoe people lived around the area. The first Anglo-American settlers to encounter the area were Kit Carson and John Fremont in 1844.

In 1862, Anglo-Americans settled around the community. They named the community Zephyr Cove, which was named after the Washoe Zephyr.

A post office called Zephyr Cove has been in operation since 1930. The name of the post office popularized the term and it soon became the name of the community.

Geography

Education 
Kingsbury Middle School was a grade 6–8 middle school located in Zephyr Cove, part of the Douglas County School District. Due to the declining student population in the area, the school closed in 2008 with the property being offered for sale in 2012.

Zephyr Cove Elementary School and George Whittell High School absorbed the student population from Kingsbury Middle School.

Zephyr Cove has a public library, a branch of the Douglas County Public Library.

Demographics

References

Census-designated places in Douglas County, Nevada
Census-designated places in Nevada